Theodoros Tselidis (in Russia known as Fyodor Nikolayevich Tselidi) is an Ossetian-Greek judoka. In 2018, he won the bronze medal for Greece at the 2018 European Judo Championships. He also won a bronze medal at the 2018 Mediterranean Games.

References

External links

 
 

Greek male judoka
Living people
1996 births
Mediterranean Games bronze medalists for Greece
Mediterranean Games medalists in judo
Competitors at the 2018 Mediterranean Games